William Epps (date of birth unknown–died 1833) was an English cricket writer and historian who was active in the late 18th century. He is noted for compiling Grand Matches of Cricket 1771 to 1791, published by Rochester Publishing Co. in 1799. His work is a recognised source and was used by Arthur Haygarth for his Scores & Biographies series.

References

Cricket historians and writers
Year of birth unknown
1833 deaths